Minuscule 424 (in the Gregory-Aland numbering), Ο12 (in the Soden numbering), is a Greek minuscule manuscript of the New Testament, on parchment. Palaeographically it has been assigned to the 11th century. 
Formerly it was designated by 66a and 67p.

Description 

The codex contains the text of the Acts of the Apostles, Catholic epistles, and Pauline epistles on 353 parchment leaves. The text is written in one columns per page, in 22 lines per page.

It contains Prolegomena (to the Acts and Pauline epistles), Synaxarion, Menologion, subscriptions at the end of each sacred book, and pictures. The Catholic epistles have subscriptions with numbers of stichoi. 
Three different hands made some corrections.

According to the subscription at the end of the Epistle to the Romans: επιστολη προς Ρωμαιους εγραφη δια Φοιβης διακονου της εν Κεγχρειαις εκκλησιας. (Epistle to Romans written by Phoebe, deaconess of the church in Cenchrea)

Text 

The Greek text of the codex is representative of the Byzantine text-type, but in the epistles it has been subjected to a thorough revision to bring it into conformity with the text of the exemplar of Minuscule 1739. Aland placed it in Category V. The text of the Epistles has higher value; Aland placed it in Category III.
It is often agree with the codex 1739.

In Acts 24:6b-8a it has unique reading εκρατησαμεν και κατα τον ημετερον νομον ηβουληθημεν κριναι κατα τον ημετερον νομον ελθων δε ο χιλιαρχος Λυσιας βια πολλη εκ των χειρων ημων αφιλετο και προς δε απεστειλε κελευσας τους κατηγορους αυτου ερχεσθαι προς σε.

In a margin notes for the text 1 John 5:6 corrector c added reading δι' ὕδατος καὶ αἵματος καὶ πνεύματος (through water and blood and spirit) together with the manuscripts: Codex Sinaiticus, Codex Alexandrinus, 104, 614, 1739c, 2412, 2495, ℓ 598m, syrh, copsa, copbo, Origen. Bart D. Ehrman identified this textual variant as Orthodox corrupt reading.

History 

The manuscript once belonged to Arsenius, Archbishop of Momembasia, then to Sebastian Tengnagel and John Sambue. It was examined by Treschow, Alter, Birch, and Griesbach. 
Alter used it in his edition of the Greek New Testament (vol. 2, 415-558). C. R. Gregory saw it in 1887. Formerly it was designated by 66a and 67p. In 1908 Gregory gave the number 424 to it.

The manuscript is currently housed at the Austrian National Library (Theol. gr. 302) in Vienna.

See also 

 List of New Testament minuscules
 Biblical manuscript
 Textual criticism
 Family 1739

Notes

References

Further reading 

 Andreas Christian Hwiid, Libellus criticus de indole codicis ms. Graeci Novi Testamenti bibliothecae Caesareo-Vindobonensis Lambecii XXXIV. Accessit textus Latinus ss Antehieronymianus ex codice Laudiano, Kopenhagen 1785.
 J. Neville Birdsall, A Byzantine Calendar from the Menology of two Biblical Mss, Analecta Bollandiana 84 (Brussels, 1966), pp. 29–57.

External links 

 Minuscule 424 at the Encyclopedia of Textual Criticism

Greek New Testament minuscules
11th-century biblical manuscripts